Service design is the activity of planning and arranging people, infrastructure, communication and material components of a service in order to improve its quality, and the interaction between the service provider and its users. Service design may function as a way to inform changes to an existing service or create a new service entirely.

The purpose of service design methodologies is to establish the most effective practices for designing services, according to both the needs of users and the competencies and capabilities of service providers. If a successful method of service design is adapted then the service will be user-friendly and relevant to the users, while being sustainable and competitive for the service provider. For this purpose, service design uses methods and tools derived from different disciplines, ranging from ethnography to information and management science to interaction design. Service design concepts and ideas are typically portrayed visually, using different representation techniques according to the culture, skill and level of understanding of the stakeholders involved in the service processes (Krucken and Meroni, 2006).

Definition 
Service design practice is the specification and construction of processes which deliver valuable capacities for action to a particular user. Service design practice can be both tangible and intangible, and can involve artifacts or other elements such as communication, environment and behaviour. Several of the authors of service design theory including Pierre Eiglier, Richard Normann, Nicola Morelli, propose that services come to existence at the same moment they are both provided and used. In contrast, products are created and "exist" before being purchased and used. While a designer can prescribe the exact configuration of a product, s/he cannot prescribe in the same way the result of the interaction between users and service providers, nor can s/he prescribe the form and characteristics of any emotional value produced by the service.

Consequently, service design is an activity that, among other things, suggests behavioural patterns or "scripts" for the actors interacting in the service. Understanding how these patterns interweave and support each other are important aspects of the character of design and service. This allows greater user freedom, and better provider adaptability to the users' needs.

History

Early service design and theory 

Early contributions to service design were made by G. Lynn Shostack, a bank and marketing manager and consultant, in the form of written articles and books. The activity of designing a service was considered to be part of the domain of marketing and management disciplines in the early years. For instance, in 1982 Shostack proposed the integration of the design of material components (products) and immaterial components (services). This design process, according to Shostack, can be documented and codified using a "service blueprint" to map the sequence of events in a service and its essential functions in an objective and explicit manner. A service blueprint is an extension of a user journey map, and this document specifies all the interactions a user has with an organisation throughout their user lifecycle.

Servicescape is a model developed by B.H. Booms and Mary Jo Bitner to focus upon the impact of the physical environment in which a service process takes place and to explain the actions of people within the service environment, with a view to designing environments which accomplish organisational goals in terms of achieving desired responses.

Service design education and practice 
In 1991, service design was first introduced as a design discipline by professors Michael Erlhoff and Brigit Mager at Köln International School of Design (KISD). In 2004, the Service Design Network was launched by Köln International School of Design, Carnegie Mellon University, Linköpings Universitet, Politecnico di Milano and Domus Academy in order to create an international network for service design academics and professionals.

In 2001, Livework, the first service design and innovation consultancy, opened for business in London. In 2003, Engine, initially founded in 2000 in London as an ideation company, positioned themselves as a service design consultancy.

Service design principles 
The 2018 book, This Is Service Design Doing: Applying Service Design Thinking in the Real World, by Adam Lawrence, Jakob Schneider, Marc Stickdorn, and Markus Edgar Hormess, proposes six service design principles:

Human-centred: Consider the experience of all the people affected by the service.
Collaborative: Stakeholders of various backgrounds and functions should be actively engaged in the service design process.
Iterative: Service design is an exploratory, adaptive, and experimental approach, iterating toward implementation.
Sequential: The service should be visualized and orchestrated as a sequence of interrelated actions.
Real: Needs should be researched in reality, ideas prototyped in reality, and intangible values evidenced as physical or digital reality.
Holistic: Services should sustainably address the needs of all stakeholders through the entire service and across the business.

In the 2011 book, This is Service Design Thinking: Basics, Tools, Cases, the first principle is “user-centred”. "User" refers to any user of the service system, including customers and employees. Thus, the authors revised “user-centred” to “human-centred” in their new book, This is service design doing, to clarify that 'human' includes service providers, customers, and all others relevant stakeholders. For instance, service design must consider not only the customer experience, but also the interests of all relevant people in retailing.

“Collaborative” and “iterative” come from the principle “co-creative” in this is service design thinking. The service exists with the participation of users, and is created by a group of people from different backgrounds. In most cases, people tend to focus only on the meaning of “collaborative”, stressing the co-operative and interdisciplinary nature of service design, but ignored the caveat that a service only exists with the participation of a user. Therefore, in the definition of new service design principles, the "co-creative" is divided into two principles of "collaborative" and "iterative". "Collaboration" is used to indicate the process of creation by the entire stakeholders from different backgrounds. "Iteration" is used to describe service design is an iterating process keeping evolve to adapt the change of business posture.

“Sequential” means that services need to be logically, rhythmically and visually displayed. Service design is a dynamic process over a period of time. The timeline is important for users in the service system. For example, when a customer shops at an online website, the first information showed up should be the regions where the products can be delivered. In this way, if the customer finds that the products cannot be delivered to their region, they will not continually browse the products on the website.

Service is often invisible and occurs in a state that the user cannot perceive. “Real” means that the intangible service needs to be displayed in a tangible way. For example, when people order food in a restaurant, they can't perceive the various attributes of the food. If we play the cultivation and picking process of vegetables in the restaurant, people can perceive the intangible services in the backstage, such as the cultivation of organic vegetables, and get a quality service experience. This service also helps the restaurant establish a natural and organic brand image to customers.

Thinking in a holistic way is the cornerstone of service design. Holistic thinking needs to consider both intangible and tangible service, and ensure that every moment the user interacts with the service, such moments known as touchpoints, is considered and optimised. Holistic thinking also needs to understand that users have multiple logics to complete an experience process. Thus, a service designer should think about each aspect from different perspectives to ensure that no needs are left unattended-to.

Methodology
Together with the most traditional methods used for product design, service design requires methods and tools to control new elements of the design process, such as the time and the interaction between actors. An overview of the methodologies for designing services is proposed by Nicola Morelli in 2006, who proposes three main directions:

 Identification of the actors involved in the definition of the service by means of appropriate analytical tools
 Definition of possible service scenarios, verifying use cases, and sequences of actions and actors’ roles in order to define the requirements for the service and its logical and organisational structure
 Representation of the service by means of techniques that illustrate all the components of the service, including physical elements, interactions, logical links and temporal sequences

Analytical tools refer to anthropology, social studies, ethnography and social construction of technology. Appropriate elaborations of those tools have been proposed with video-ethnography and different observation techniques to gather data about users’ actions. Other methods, such as cultural probes, have been developed in the design discipline, which aim to capture information on users in their context of use (Gaver, Dunne et al. 1999; Lindsay and Rocchi 2003).

Design tools aim at producing a blueprint of the service, which describes the nature and characteristics of the interaction in the service. Design tools include service scenarios (which describe the interaction) and use cases (which illustrate the detail of time sequences in a service encounter). Both techniques are already used in software and systems engineering to capture the functional requirements of a system. However, when used in service design, they have been adequately adapted to include more information concerning material and immaterial components of a service, as well as time sequences and physical flows. Crowdsourced information has been shown to be highly beneficial in providing such information for service design purposes, particularly when the information has either a very low or very high monetary value. Other techniques, such as IDEF0, just in time and total quality management are used to produce functional models of the service system and to control its processes. However, it is important to note that such tools may prove too rigid to describe services in which users are supposed to have an active role, because of the high level of uncertainty related to the user's behaviour.

Because of the need for communication between inner mechanisms of services and actors (such as final users), representation techniques are critical in service design. For this reason, storyboards are often used to illustrate the interaction of the front office. Other representation techniques have been used to illustrate the system of interactions or a "platform" in a service (Manzini, Collina et al. 2004). Recently, video sketching (Jegou 2009, Keitsch et al. 2010) and prototypes (Blomkvist 2014) have also been used to produce quick and effective tools to stimulate users' participation in the development of the service and their involvement in the value production process.

Public sector service design 

Public sector service design is associated with civic technology, open government, e-government, and can constitute either government-led or citizen-led initiatives. The public sector is the part of the economy composed of public services and public enterprises. Public services include public goods and governmental services such as the military, police, infrastructure (public roads, bridges, tunnels, water supply, sewers, electrical grids, telecommunications, etc.), public transit, public education, along with health care and those working for the government itself, such as elected officials. Due to new investments in hospitals, schools, cultural institutions and security infrastructures in the last few years, the public sector has expanded in many countries. The number of jobs in public services has also grown; such growth can be associated with the large and rapid social change that is in itself a trigger for fresh design. In this context, some governments are considering service design as a means to bring about better-designed public services.

Denmark 
In 2002, MindLab, an innovation public sector service design group was established by the Danish ministries of Business and Growth, Employment, and Children and Education. MindLab was the one of the world's first public sector design innovation labs and their work inspired the proliferation of similar labs and user-centred design methodologies deployed in many countries worldwide. The design methods used at MindLab are typically an iterative approach of prototyping and testing, to evolve not just their government projects, but also the government's organisational structure using ethnographic-inspired user research, creative ideation processes, and visualisation and modelling of service prototypes. In Denmark, design within the public sector has been applied to a variety of projects including rethinking Copenhagen's waste management, improving social interactions between convicts and guards in Danish prisons, transforming services in Odense for mentally disabled adults and more.

United Kingdom 

In 2007 and 2008 documents from the British government explore the concept of "user-driven public services" and scenarios of highly personalised public services. The documents proposed a new view on the role of service providers and users in the development of new and highly customised public services, employing user involvement methods. While this approach has been explored through an early initiative in the UK, the possibilities of service design for the public sector are also being researched, picked up, and promoted in European Union countries including Belgium.

The Behavioural Insights Team (BIT) were originally established under the auspices of the Cabinet Office in 2010, in order to apply nudge theory to try to improve UK government policy interventions and save money. In 2014 BIT was 'spun-out' to become a company allied to Nesta (charity), BIT employees and the UK government each owning a third of this new business. That same year a Nudge unit was added to the United States government under President Obama, referred to as the ‘US Nudge Unit,’ working within the White House Office of Science and Technology Policy.

New Zealand 
In recent years New Zealand has seen a significant increase in the use of Service Design approaches and methods applied to challenges faced by the public sector. One instance of service design approaches being applied is with the Family 100 project which focused on the experiences of families living in urban poverty in Auckland. A report "Speaking for Ourselves" and a companion empathy tool "Demonstrating the complexities of being poor"' were released in July 2014. The report and empathy tool were released as the result of a collective service design effort by the Auckland Council, Auckland City Mission, ThinkPlace (a Service Design consultancy) as well as researchers from Waikato University, Massey University, and the University of Auckland. Since its release the report has seen extensive use and has assisted in both the engagement of stakeholders as well as the development of public services focussed on achieving better outcomes for those experiencing urban poverty.

Private sector service design 

Real-world service design work can be experienced as new and useful approaches as well as entail some challenges in practice, as identified in field research (see e.g. Jevnaker et al., 2015).
A practical example of service design thinking can be found at the Myyrmanni shopping mall in Vantaa, Finland. The management attempted to improve the customer flow to the second floor as there were queues at the landscape lifts and the KONE steel car lifts were ignored. To improve customer flow to the second floor of the mall (2010) Kone Lifts implemented their 'People Flow' Service Design Thinking by turning the elevators into a Hall of Fame for the 'Incredibles' comic strip characters. Making their elevators more attractive to the public solved the people flow problem. This case of service design thinking by Kone Elevator Company is used in literature as an example of extending products into services.

Service Design in different industries

Health care 
Clinical service redesign is an approach to improving quality and productivity in health. A redesign is ideally clinically-led and involves all stakeholders (e.g. primary and secondary care clinicians, senior management, patients, commissioners etc.) to ensure national and local clinical standards are set and communicated across the care settings. By following the patient's journey or pathway, the team can focus on improving both the patient experience and the outcomes of care.

See also

Related design roles 
 Chief experience officer
 Customer service
 Enterprise architecture
 Facilitator (Design facilitation)
 User experience design
 User research
 Industrial design
 Interaction design
 Experience design
 Design thinking
 Design research
 Codesign
 Human-centered design
 User-centered design
 Strategic design
 Social design
 Design (Design disciplines)
 Designer (Design professions)
 Graphic Design
 Visual Communication
 Data Visualization
 Information Visualization
 Concept design
 Concept art
 Spatial design

Related economics 
 Service (economics)
 Service economy
 Circular economy

Related business and practices 
 Product service system
 Service management
 Service recovery
 Service science, management and engineering
 Services marketing
 Servicescapes
 Co-creation
 Service-dominant logic
 Systems thinking
 Sustainability
 Management
 Leadership
 Business strategy
 Operations management
 Engineering
 Technology
 Science
 Strategic management
 Humanities
 Anthropology
 Sociology
 Psychology
 Philosophy
 Information technology
 Innovation management

References

Further reading 
Bechmann, Søren (2010): "Servicedesign", Gyldendal Akademisk.
Curedale, Robert Service Design Process & Methods 3rd Edition, Design Community College Inc.,2018.
Gaver B., Dunne T., Pacenti E., (1999). "Design: Cultural Probes." Interaction 6(1): 21–29.
Hollins, G., Hollins, Bill (1991). Total Design : Managing the design process in the service sector. London, Pitman.
Jegou, F. 2009. Co-design Approaches for Early Phases of Augmented Environments. In: LALOU, S. (ed.) Designing User Friendly Augmented Work Environments: From Meeting Rooms to Digital Collaborative Spaces, Computer Supported Cooperative Work. London: Springer.
Krucken, L. & Meroni, A. 2006. "Building Stakeholder Networks to Develop and Deliver Product-Service-Systems: Practical Experiences on Elaborating Pro-Active Materials for Communication". Journal of Cleaner Production, vol 14 (17)
Løvlie, L., Polaine, A., Reason, B. (2013). Service Design: From Insight to Implementation. New York: Rosenfeld Media. .
Moritz, S. (2005). Service Design: Practical access to an evolving field. London.
Normann, R. and R. Ramirez (1994).  Designing Interactive Strategy. From Value Chain to Value Constellation. New York, John Wiley and Sons.
Ramaswamy, R. (1996). Design and management of service processes. Reading, Mass., Addison–Wesley Pub. Co.

Design
IT service management
Innovation
Services marketing